James Strange French (1807-1886) was a lawyer, novelist, and later hotel keeper.

Early life
James Strange French was born in Dinwiddie County, Virginia, in 1807. He was educated at the College of William & Mary and the University of Virginia, then read law with his uncle Robert Strange in Fayetteville, North Carolina.

Career
In 1831, French represented Nat Turner, as well as a number of other slaves accused of participating in Nat Turner's slave rebellion.  French was joined in defending slaves by Meriwether Brodnax, William Henry Brodnax, Thomas Ruffin Gray, who published The Confessions of Nat Turner and is commonly referred to as Nat Turner's lawyer, and William C. Parker.  Those assertions are not entirely true.  Meriwether B. Brodnax (sometimes written Merewether B. Broadnax) was a prosecutor, and his brother William Henry Brodnax is not mentioned in the court minutes, but in Sussex Court minutes.  William C. Parker was assigned by the court to represent Nat. In 1835, French helped secure the commutation of a sentence of a slave, Boson, who had been sentenced to death following the rebellion, then escaped from the Sussex County jail.

French was the author of at least two novels.  The first, Sketches and Eccentricities of Col. David Crockett of West Tennessee, appeared in 1833.  The second, Elkswatawa, was set in the early nineteenth century.  It was a romance set around Tecumseh's War.  It portrayed Native Americans sympathetically and, thus, may contain some clues to French's attitudes towards the legal system's treatment of Natives and slaves. Edgar Allan Poe published a critical review of it in Southern Literary Messenger in 1836.  Though they had studied together at the University of Virginia, Poe was quite critical of the plot and prose.  French married Laura J. George on June 6, 1850, in "Willow Grove", Tazewell County, Virginia.

Death
French died on February 7, 1886, in Gordonsville, Virginia.

References

1807 births
1886 deaths
College of William & Mary alumni
University of Virginia alumni
North Carolina lawyers
19th-century American novelists
American male novelists
Place of birth missing
19th-century American male writers
Novelists from Virginia
People from Dinwiddie County, Virginia